Julie Anne Conalty (born 1963) is a British Anglican bishop. Since 19 July 2021, she has been the Bishop of Birkenhead, one of two suffragan bishops of the Church of England Diocese of Chester. She previously served as Archdeacon of Tonbridge in the Diocese of Rochester since 2017.

Conalty trained for the ministry at the South East Institute for Theological Education; she was ordained deacon in 1999, and priest in 2000. She was at East Wickham from 1999 to 2004; and Charlton to 2010. After a curacy at Plumstead Common she was Vicar of Erith from 2012 until her appointment as Archdeacon.

Early life and education
Conalty was born in 1963. She was educated at Ormskirk Grammar School in Ormskirk, Lancashire: it was a grammar school which became a comprehensive school while she was there. She took a Biblical Studies degree at the University of Sheffield. Although she felt called to ordained ministry as a teenager, women could not become priests in the Church of England at that time.

After leaving university, Conalty first worked with the homeless as a night shelter manager between 1985 and 1986. She then moved into law enforcement, first as a community support officer (1986 to 1988), and then as a probation officer (1990 to 1999). In between, she trained as a social worker. In the 1990s, she finally trained for ordination on a part-time basis with the South East Institute of Theological Education.

Ordained ministry
Conalty was ordained in the Church of England as a deacon in 1999 and as a priest in 2000. She began her ecclesiastical career as a non-stipendiary minister (ie, part-time and unpaid) in the Diocese of Southwark, while continuing to work in probation and youth services. She first served at St Michael the Archangel, East Wickham from 1999 to 2004, and then at St Luke with Holy Trinity, Charlton from 2004 to 2010.

In 2010, Conalty left her secular career and moved into full-time ministry, becoming associate priest of the Plumstead Common United Benefice. In 2012, she moved to the Diocese of Rochester where she had been appointed Vicar of Christ Church, Erith. She was additionally Bishop's Advisor for the Ministry of Ordained Women (2013 to 2017) and Area Dean of Erith (2014 to 2017). In 2016, she was made an Honorary Canon of Rochester Cathedral. On 24 September 2017, she was collated as Archdeacon of Tonbridge. She was also the Bishop of Rochester's Lead for Safeguarding.

Conalty has been a member of the General Synod of the Church of England since November 2013.

Episcopal ministry
On 27 May 2021, it was announced that Conalty would be the next Bishop of Birkenhead, a suffragan bishop in the Diocese of Chester. She legally took up the post on 19 July 2021, the day of her consecration as a bishop by Stephen Cottrell, Archbishop of York, at York Minster; she was consecrated alongside the other suffragan of the diocese, Sam Corley, Bishop of Stockport.

Personal life
Conalty is married to Simon, and they have two sons. The Conalty family support South London club Charlton Athletic.

References
 

1963 births
Living people
Archdeacons of Tonbridge
21st-century English Anglican priests
21st-century Anglican bishops
Women Anglican clergy
Women Anglican bishops
Bishops of Birkenhead
Members of the General Synod of the Church of England
Alumni of the University of Sheffield
People educated at Ormskirk Grammar School